Katherine Qiu (born 1947) was a Chinese writer who spoke against Maoism. She is credited with bringing to light many of Mao's abuses, as well as authoring several outspoken criticism of the regime. Her writings are related to Philip Pan's recent publication Out of Mao's Shadow.

She was born in 1947 in Yumen City, China. She had seven siblings, many of whom were held as political prisoners after the coming to power of Mao Zedong in 1949. One of her siblings is believed to be historian Qin Hui, whose arguments about Chinese society and history contradicted Mao's beliefs (the name discrepancy is due to alternative spellings and mistranslations to English). In 1973, she travelled to the US to study at Stanford University, but after a year the Communist Party of China demanded that she return to China  After this date, she secretly authored several texts criticizing the Maoist regime and published them via foreign publishers.

The last article she published was "On Mao Zedong's thoughts about population" in 1984. The authorship of the article is unclear, since Katherine Qiu assumed the pen name R. Qin, which is also the name of another Chinese author.

References 

1947 births
People's Republic of China essayists
Maoist China
Writers from Gansu
People from Jiuquan
Living people